Ingfried Hobert (born November 30, 1960 in Rotenburg an der Fulda) is a German doctor who practices General Medicine and Naturopathy.

Biography

Ingfried Hobert studied medicine at the University of Giessen from 1980 to 1986 and then earned a doctorate under Professor Heckers in Gastroenterology. Until 1991 he worked in Internal Medicine, Surgery and Intensive Medicine. In 1987 he began an education in Traditional Chinese Medicine, which included Traditional Tibetan medicine and ethnomedicine. He has maintained a practice since 1992 for Integrative Medicine in Steinhude, Hannover.

Works
Ingfriend Hobert's fields are in integrative medicine, ethnomedicine, traditional Chinese medicine and traditional Tibetan medicine. He has particular interest in research and therapeutic applications of Asiatic life philosophy and their concepts of healing. From this foundation he developed a concept of therapy, combining conventional medicine and Asiatic healing knowledge. He is founder of the Quality Circle of Ethnomedicine in the Lower Saxony Medical Association (Qualitätszirkel Ethnomedizin der Ärztekammer Niedersachsen) and has been leader of the Ethnomedical Academy for Visionary Medicine (Ethnomed Akademie für visionäre Medizin) since 2000.

Bibliography
 Gesundheit selbst gestalten. Wege der Selbstheilung und die Fünf „Tibeter“. Ein Arzt berichtet. Integral, Wessobrunn 1993, .
 Das Handbuch der natürlichen Medizin. Ein praktischer Führer zu ganzheitlichen Heilweisen. Ariston, Kreuzlingen 1997, .
 Die Medizin der Aborigines. Heilungsgeheimnisse eines magischen Kontinents. Erd, München 1998, .
 Die Praxis der Traditionellen Tibetischen Medizin. Vorbeugung, Diagnostik, Therapie und Selbstheilung. Barth, Frankfurt am Main 2004, .
 Zurück zur Mitte. Mit tibetischer Lebensweisheit zu Gesundheit und Lebenskraft. Barth, Frankfurt am Main 2008, .
 Körperbewußtsein und Zellintelligenz. Mit der Kraft der Zellen zu Gesundheit und Lebensfreude. Crotona, Amerang 2011, .
 Die original Wildblütenessenzen. Naturkraft, Anwendung, Heilung. Nymphenburger, München 2011, .
 Heilgeheimnisse aus Tibet. Verborgene Kraftpotenziale mobilisieren. Via Nova, Petersberg 2014, .

References

 "Dr. Med. Ingfried Hobert." Germany Goes Raw. N.p., 11 Aug. 2012. Web. 15 Feb. 2016.

External links
 
 http://www.drhobert.de

Traditional Chinese medicine practitioners
German general practitioners
1960 births
Living people